Ginkūnai Manor was a former residential manor in Ginkūnai, Šiauliai District Municipality, Lithuania.

References

Manor houses in Lithuania
Buildings and structures in Šiauliai County